Kartan was a double city, a town of Naphtali, assigned to the Gershonite Levites, and one of the Cities of Refuge. It was probably near the north-western shore of the Sea of Tiberias, identical with the ruined village el-Katanah.

References

Hebrew Bible cities
Sea of Galilee
Cities of refuge